The men's Greco-Roman light heavyweight was one of thirteen wrestling events held as part of the wrestling at the 1928 Summer Olympics programme. The competition was held from August 2 to 5, and featured 17 wrestlers from 17 nations.

Competition format

This Greco-Roman wrestling competition introduced an elimination system based on the accumulation of points. Each round featured all wrestlers pairing off and wrestling one bout (with one wrestler having a bye if there were an odd number). The loser received 3 points. The winner received 1 point if the win was by decision and 0 points if the win was by fall. At the end of each round, any wrestler with at least 5 points was eliminated.

Results

Round 1

The first round produced 4 winners by fall (0 points), 1 bye (0 points), 4 winners by decision (1 point), and 8 losers (3 points). Westergren withdrew after his bout.

 Bouts

 Points

Round 2

None of the men who started the round with 0 points finished it that sway; Szalay and Moustafa received 1 point after winning by decision, while the other 3 lost. They were the only 2 to have a point total low enough to withstand a loss after this round. Pellinen and Rieger each had 2 points after winning both of their bouts by decision. The other 9 remaining wrestlers each had a loss. Only three men were eliminated with their second loss in round 2.

 Bouts

 Points

Round 3

The third round featured 4 out of 6 bouts where the winner was guaranteed to advance and the loser guaranteed elimination. Vávra needed to win by fall to avoid elimination; he did. The sixth bout was between Szalay (1 point) and Clody (4 points); the former would advance even if he lost while the latter could be eliminated even with a win, it was by decision. That is exactly what happened; Clody's decision eliminated him but left Szalay at 4 points and still in contention. Moustafa had the bye and stayed at 1 point, now in sole possession of the lead.

 Bouts

 Points

Round 4

The three losers were eliminated. The three winners, and Appels on a bye, continued on.

 Bouts

 Points

Round 5

Pellinen and Appels were eliminated, with the bronze medal and 4th place, respectively. Rieger and Moustafa, both undefeated, advanced to face each other in a de facto gold medal bout.

 Bouts

 Points

Round 6

Moustafa defeated Rieger to take the gold medal.

 Bouts

 Points

References

Wrestling at the 1928 Summer Olympics